Nkosi Thembile Botman (born 10 June 1976), is a South African actor and businessman.

Personal life
Botman was born on 10 June 1976 in South Africa.

He is married to fellow actress Nkuli Sibeko.

Career
In 2011, he joined with regular cast of the SABC1/SABC2 sitcom Abo Mzala, where he played the role "Mpho" in first three seasons until 2018. In the meantime, he appeared in the Mzansi Magic soap opera Zabalaza with role "Marcus" in 2013 and then in SABC1 musical drama series Loxion Lyric with the role "Hilton" in 2014. After that, he played the role "Shaka" in the eKasi+ comedy drama series uSkroef noSexy. In 2016, he joined with the Mzansi Magic supernatural series Igazi and played the role "Mkhokeli".

Apart from acting, he held fitness workshops across the country along with Vuyo Dabula which was started with an event at Khuma Stadium in Klerksdorp on March 24.

Arrest
In 2019, he was arrested during a protest after a bread truck was looted by the protestors at the Orkney-Potchefstroom Road near Khuma. Then he was charged with bread theft. However in 2020, he escaped imprisonment after charges against him were withdrawn.

Filmography

References

1976 births
Living people
South African male television actors